is a Japanese professional boxer who held the WBO mini-flyweight title in 2017 and challenged twice for the WBC mini-flyweight title in 2017 and 2019.

Professional career

Fukuhara made his debut on April 14, 2008, beating Katsuhiko Muranaka by majority decision. Fukuhara suffered a unanimous decision loss (55-59, 55–59, 56–59) to Takuma Inoue on the latter's debut fight. Fukuhara's record after that fight stood at 12-4-3. In September 2014, Fukuhara went to a majority draw with Fahlan Sakkreerin Jr. in Thailand. Fukuhara won the Japanese mini-flyweight title by beating Hiroya Yamamoto by unanimous decision. On his second title defense, Fukuhara drew with Shin Ono by technical draw. Fukuhara would defend the title three times before vacating it to fight for an interim world title.

On February 26, 2017, Fukuhara defeated Mexican Moises Calleros (25-6-1) via 12-round split decision to win the WBO interim mini-flyweight title. He was promoted to full champion after original champion Katsunari Takayama vacated the title upon his retirement. He lost the title in his first defense to fellow countryman Ryuya Yamanaka. Fukuhara received another title shot against WBC mini-flyweight champion Wanheng Menayothin. The fight was closely contested, and went to a decision after twelve rounds, with Wanheng winning by unanimous decision (118-110, 116–111, 117–113).

Professional boxing record

See also
List of Mini-flyweight boxing champions
List of Japanese boxing world champions

References

External links

1989 births
Living people
Mini-flyweight boxers
World mini-flyweight boxing champions
World Boxing Organization champions
Sportspeople from Kumamoto Prefecture
Japanese male boxers